Jacoby Jajuan Brissett (born December 11, 1992) is an American football quarterback for the Washington Commanders of the National Football League (NFL). He played college football at Florida and NC State before being selected by the New England Patriots in the third round of the 2016 NFL Draft. Brissett was traded to the Indianapolis Colts after his rookie season, where he was their primary starter in 2017 and 2019. He has also played for the Miami Dolphins and Cleveland Browns.

Early years
Brissett was born on December 11, 1992, in West Palm Beach, Florida. He later attended William T. Dwyer High School in Palm Beach Gardens, Florida. Rivals.com ranked him as a four-star recruit and the third best dual-threat quarterback of his class. He committed to play college football at the University of Florida in February 2011.

College career
As a true freshman at Florida in 2011, Brissett was a backup to starter John Brantley. In October, he started his first two career games, after Brantley was injured. His first career start came against number-one ranked LSU. He threw for 94 yards, one touchdown and two interceptions in the 41–11 loss. Overall, he appeared in eight games, completing 18-of-39 passes for 206 yards, two touchdowns, and four interceptions. Entering his sophomore season, Brissett competed with Jeff Driskel for the Gators starting job. On September 1, he started the opening game against Bowling Green. However, Driskel was the starter for the rest of the season. Brissett started his second game of the season on November 17 against Jacksonville State after Driskel was unable to play due to injury. Overall, he appeared in five games, completing 23-of-35 for 249 yards and a touchdown.

Brissett transferred to NC State in January 2013. After sitting out the 2013 season due to transfer rules, Brissett took over as the Wolfpack's starting quarterback for 2014. That year, he passed for 2,606 yards with 23 touchdowns and five interceptions. As a senior in 2015, he passed for 2,662 yards and 20 touchdowns and six interceptions.

Professional career

New England Patriots
Brissett was selected by the New England Patriots in the third round with the 91st overall pick in the 2016 NFL Draft. He was the fifth quarterback to be selected that year. He was the only player selected in the 2016 draft who declined to hire an agent. On June 16, 2016, Brissett signed a four-year rookie contract with the Patriots, a contract he negotiated on his own.

Brissett played in his first regular season game on September 18, 2016, after starter Jimmy Garoppolo left the Patriots' Week 2 game against the Miami Dolphins after suffering a shoulder injury. The Patriots were leading 21–0 at the time, and Brissett finished the game completing 6-of-9 passes for 92 passing yards as the Patriots won 31–24. The next week, Brissett made his first career start against the Houston Texans, completing 11-of-19 passes for 103 yards and carrying the ball eight times for 48 yards including a 27-yard touchdown run in a 27–0 victory. He became the first African-American quarterback to start for the Patriots. Brissett injured his thumb in the game against the Texans, but started the following week in a 16–0 loss to the Buffalo Bills. Because the Patriots needed a roster spot for Tom Brady after Brady's Deflategate suspension had ended, Brissett was placed on injured reserve on October 7, 2016, after having thumb surgery. The Patriots activated Brissett from the injured reserve list; he began practicing on November 30, 2016, and was activated to the 53-man roster on December 21, 2016. He was inactive for all of the Patriots' remaining games, including Super Bowl LI, which the Patriots won 34–28 over the Atlanta Falcons.

Indianapolis Colts

2017 season

On September 2, 2017, Brissett was traded to the Indianapolis Colts for wide receiver Phillip Dorsett; the Colts had needed another quarterback after Andrew Luck suffered an injury. On September 10, 2017, Brissett made his debut with the Colts, relieving starting quarterback Scott Tolzien in the fourth quarter, and completed 2-of-3 passes for 51 yards as the Colts lost to the Los Angeles Rams 46–9. The following week, he earned his first start with the Colts and threw for 216 yards against the Arizona Cardinals. After a 13–13 tie in regulation, Brissett threw an interception to Tyrann Mathieu in the first play of overtime, leading to an Arizona Cardinals 16–13 victory.

On September 24, 2017, Brissett had two rushing touchdowns and completed 17-for-24 for 259 yards and a touchdown during a 31–28 victory over the Cleveland Browns. This marked his first victory and passing touchdown as a member of the Colts. During a Week 5 matchup against the San Francisco 49ers, Brissett completed 22-of-34 pass attempts for a career-high 314-yards and an interception, as the Colts won 26–23. In the victory, he also contributed a rushing touchdown. In Week 9, against the Houston Texans, he had 308 passing yards and two touchdowns in the 20–14 victory. After a six-game losing streak, Brissett had 114 passing yards and a touchdown in the regular season finale victory over the Texans. Overall in the 2017 season, Brissett had 3,098 passing yards, 13 passing touchdowns, seven interceptions, 260 rushing yards, and four rushing touchdowns. The Colts finished the 2017 season with a 4–12 record.

2018 season

Brissett returned to the backup role in 2018 with Luck returning from his shoulder injury. In Week 3 against the Philadelphia Eagles, with the Colts down 20–16 with seconds left in the game, Brissett replaced Luck to attempt a Hail Mary pass from his own 46-yard line. He overthrew several players in the back of the end zone and the Colts lost the game. The move was questioned by some journalists and fans, and led to some speculation about the health of Luck's shoulder, although head coach Frank Reich and Luck both said it was purely because Brissett had a stronger throwing arm. In a Week 12 win over the Miami Dolphins, Brissett was brought in and completed a 4th and short throw to Luck, who was lined up as a receiver. Overall, in the 2018 season, Brissett appeared in four games.

2019 season

Brissett was set to be the Colts' backup quarterback heading into the 2019 season. However, on August 24, 2019, two weeks before the start of the 2019 regular season, Andrew Luck abruptly announced his retirement. Colts general manager Chris Ballard confirmed in a subsequent press conference that Brissett would be the full-time starting quarterback going into the season. On September 2, 2019, Brissett signed a two-year, $30 million contract with the Colts, with $20 million guaranteed, a contract he again negotiated himself because he doesn't "like people to BS on his behalf." He was previously in the final year of his rookie contract and was set to make $2 million for the season.

In Week 1 against the Los Angeles Chargers, Brissett threw for 190 yards and two touchdown passes to T. Y. Hilton in a 30–24 overtime loss. On September 15, 2019, Brissett led the Colts to a 19–17 win over division rival Tennessee Titans with three touchdown passes and one interception. In Week 3 against the Atlanta Falcons, Brissett threw for 310 yards and two touchdowns, as well as completing his first 16 pass attempts, as the Colts won 27–24. In Week 4 against the Oakland Raiders, Brissett threw 46 passes with 24 completions for 265 yards, including three passing touchdowns, but he also threw a late interception that was returned for a touchdown by Erik Harris to seal the Colts' 31–24 loss. In Week 5, against the eventual Super Bowl champions Kansas City Chiefs, Brissett threw for 151 yards and ran for their lone touchdown in the 19-13 win.

In Week 7 against the Houston Texans, Brissett threw for 326 yards and four touchdowns in the 30–23 win. He was named the AFC Offensive Player of the Week for his performance. The remainder of the season did not fare well for Brissett and the Colts with a 3–6 finish. In that stretch, he passed for 172.7 yards per game and totaled only four passing touchdowns to three interceptions. Overall, he finished the season with 2,942 passing yards, 18 passing touchdowns, and six interceptions to go along with 228 rushing yards and four rushing touchdowns.

2020 season
With the Colts signing Philip Rivers in the offseason, Brissett remained the team's backup. Brissett carved out a role where he would come into the game in relief of Rivers on deep passes and short-yardage situations. He scored a rushing touchdown on a two-yard play in Week 10 against the Tennessee Titans. 
In Week 12 against the Tennessee Titans, Brissett recorded two rushing touchdowns during the 45–26 loss.

Miami Dolphins
On March 18, 2021, Brissett signed a one-year contract with the Miami Dolphins, reuniting Brissett with Dolphins head coach Brian Flores, who served as the Patriots linebacker coach during Brissett's rookie season with the team.

On September 19, 2021, in Week 2, Brissett came into the game against the Buffalo Bills after Tua Tagovailoa left the game with a rib injury. Brissett threw for 169 yards and an interception as the Dolphins lost 35–0. Brissett was named the starter for the Dolphins Week 3 matchup against the Las Vegas Raiders due to Tagovailoa's injury.

Cleveland Browns
On March 25, 2022, Brissett signed a one-year contract with the Cleveland Browns. Due to Deshaun Watson's sexual harassment allegations and his 11-game suspension, Brissett was named the Week 1 starter for the Browns game against the Carolina Panthers. Brissett started and played every offensive snap in each of the Browns first 11 games, leading them to a 4-7 record with 2608 passing yards and 14 total touchdowns while completing 64% of his passes for an 88.9 passer rating, both career highs.

Washington Commanders
On March 16, 2023, Brissett signed a one-year, $10 million contract with the Washington Commanders.

NFL career statistics

Regular season

Postseason

Notes

References

External links

 Washington Commanders bio
 NC State Wolfpack bio 
 Florida Gators bio

1992 births
African-American players of American football
American football quarterbacks
Cleveland Browns players
Florida Gators football players
Indianapolis Colts players
Living people
Miami Dolphins players
NC State Wolfpack football players
New England Patriots players
Players of American football from Florida
Sportspeople from West Palm Beach, Florida
Washington Commanders players